Lyon Woodstock (born 13 August 1993) is an English professional boxer who held the WBO European super-featherweight title from 2017 to 2018 and challenged for the Commonwealth super-featherweight title in 2019.

Professional career

Woodstock made his professional debut on 12 June 2015, scoring a first-round knockout (KO) victory over Reece Smith at the York Hall in London.

After compiling a record of 8–0 (4 KOs) he faced Paul Holt for the vacant Midlands Area super-featherweight title on 22 April 2017 at the Leicester Arena. Woodstock got off to a troubled start in the first round before taking control in the second. The referee called a halt to the contest in the third round after Woodstock landed clean uppercuts while Holt was pinned against the ropes, awarding Woodstock the Midlands Area title via technical knockout (TKO).

In his next fight he challenged for the vacant WBO European super-featherweight title, facing Craig Poxton on 21 October 2017 at the First Direct Arena in Leeds. Woodstock captured the WBO regional title via unanimous decision (UD) with the judges' scorecards reading 98–93, 97–93 and 97–95. Following a points decision (PTS) win against Edwin Tellez in a non-title fight in May 2018, Woodstock made the first defence of his title against Archie Sharp on 6 October at the Morningside Arena (formerly Leicester Arena). After being knocked down in the opening round by a left hook, Woodstock went on to lose his title via UD over ten rounds. All three judges scored the bout 96–93.

After bouncing back from defeat with a PTS win against Sergio Gonzalez in March 2019, he faced Zelfa Barrett for the vacant Commonwealth super-featherweight title on 15 June at the First Direct Arena. After struggling to keep up with Barrett's speed and movement, Woodstock lost by UD over twelve rounds. One judge scored the bout 118–110 while the other two scored it 117–111, handing Woodstock the second defeat of his career.

In recent times, he has taken the opportunity to train a new breed of boxing amateurs. He currently has a stand out student who he has identified as a future WBO, WBC Slazenger Champion, some can't even say his actual name. He goes by the title, Beast. DAZN are you listening.

Professional boxing record

References

External links

1993 births
Living people
English male boxers
Boxers from Greater London
Super-featherweight boxers
Lightweight boxers